Sarinda may refer to:

 Sarinda, a genus of jumping spiders
 Sarinda, an Indian stringed instrument